(Main list of acronyms)


 L – (s) Fifty (in Roman numerals) – (i) Label – Lap – Large – Laser (US military aircraft basic mission designation) – Latin – Left – (s) Litre – (i) Low (transmissions)

LA
 l8r, g8r – (a) later, gator
 la – (s) Latin language (ISO 639-1 code)
 La – (s) Lanthanum
 LA
 (s) Laos (FIPS 10-4 country code; ISO 3166 digram)
 Louisiana (postal symbol)
 (i) Los Angeles
 LAAS
 (i) Local Area Augmentation System
 Los Angeles Astronomical Society
 LAB – (a) Logistics Assault Base
 LabVIEW – (p) Laboratory Virtual Instrumentation Engineering Workbench
 LACMA – (a/i) Los Angeles County Museum of Art
 LAD – (a) Laser Aiming Device
 LADW – (i) Local Air Defence Warning
 LAESI – (i) Local Authority & Emergency Service Information
 LAK – (s) Laotian kip (ISO 4217 currency code)
 LAMP – (multiple meanings)
 LAN – (a) Local Area Network
 LANL – (i) Los Alamos National Laboratory
 lao – (s) Lao language (ISO 639-2 code)
 LAO – (s) Laos (ISO 3166 trigram)
 LAPD – (i) Los Angeles Police Department
 LAR
 Light Armoured Reconnaissance
 Logistics Assistance Representative
 LARC – (a) Livermore Advanced Research Computer (cf. LLNL)
 LARP – (a) Live-Action Role-Playing
 LAS – (s) McCarran International Airport (Las Vegas, Nevada)
 Laser – (a) Light Amplification by Stimulated Emission of Radiation (cf. Maser)
 lat – (s) Latin language (ISO 639-2 code)
 LAT
 (i/a) Lowest Astronomical Tide (nautical charts)
 Licensed Athletic Trainer (used in many of the United States; see www.oata.org)
 LATA – (i) Local Access Transport Area
 LATCH – (p) Lower Anchors and Tethers for Children (U.S. standard for attachment points for child safety seats in passenger cars)
 lav – (s) Latvian language (ISO 639-2 code)
 LAV
 (a) Land Assault Vehicle
 Light Armoured Vehicle
 Lymphadenopathy-Associated Virus
 LAW] – (a) Light Antitank Weapon
 LAX
 (s) Los Angeles International Airport
 (i) The Latin American Xchange (professional wrestling)

LB
 lb
 (s) pound (Latin librum)
 Luxembourgish language (ISO 639-1 code)
 LB – (s) Lebanon (ISO 3166 digram)
 LBH
 (i) Light Battlefield Helicopter
 Lyman-Birge-Hopfield bands
 LBJ
 (i) Lady Bird Johnson
 LeBron James
 Light Bulb Joke
 Little Beagle Johnson (the dog owned by Lyndon and Lady Bird Johnson)
 Lyndon Baines Johnson
 LBN – (s) Lebanon (ISO 3166 trigram)
 LBNL – (i) Lawrence Berkeley National Laboratory
 LBP – (s) Lebanese pound (ISO 4217 currency code)
 LBR – (s) Liberia (ISO 3166 trigram)
 LBS – (i) Location-based service
 lbs – (s) pounds (plural form of lb, see above)
 LBT – (i) Large Binocular Telescope
 LBW – (i) Leg Before Wicket
 LBY – (s) Libya (ISO 3166 trigram)

LC
 LC – (i) Line of Contact – (s) Saint Lucia (ISO 3166 digram)
 LC2IEDM or LC2IEDM – (i) Land C2IEDM (q.v.)
 LCA – (s) Saint Lucia (ISO 3166 trigram)
 LCC – (i) Land Component Commander
 LCCP – (i) Light Contingency Communications Package
 LCD – (i) Liquid Crystal Display
 LCE – (i) Leaving Certificate Examination – Load Carrying Equipment – London Commodity Exchange
 LCM – (i) Least/Lowest Common Multiple
 LCol – (s) Lieutenant-Colonel (Canada, UK)
LCS - League of Legends Championship Series

LD
 LD
 (i) Laser Designator
 Limited Deployment
 Line of Departure
 LDA – (i) Lateral Drift Apparatus (paratroops)
 LDAP – (a/i) Lightweight Directory Access Protocol (pronounced "ell-dap")
 LDC – (i) Lesser Developing/Developed Country
 LDL – (i) Low-Density Lipoprotein
 LDMOS – (i/a) Laterally diffused MOS transistor ("ell-dee-moss")
 LDS
 (i) Latter-day Saint (also "Latter Day Saint"); also used as an abbreviation by the Church of Jesus Christ of Latter-day Saints
 Liberal Democracy of Slovenia
 LDV – (i) Local Defence Volunteers (British Home Guard)
 LDW – Lane Departure Warning (ADAS)

LE
 LE – (s) Lebanon (FIPS 10-4 country code)
 LEC – (i) Local Exchange Carrier
 LED – (i) Light-Emitting Diode
 Legs – (a) level emotion gad speed
 LEGAD – (p) Legal Advice
 LEMOSS – (p) Long-Endurance MObile Submarine Simulator
 LEN – (i) Large Extension Node
 LEO – (a) Low Earth orbit
 LEP – (a) Large Electron-Positron collider
 LER – (i) Loss-Exchange Ratio
 LEU – (i) Low-Enriched Uranium

LF
 LF – (i) Low Frequency
 LFO – (i) Low Frequency Oscillation / Oscillator
 LFTR – (i) Liquid fluoride thorium reactor

LG
 lg – (s) Luganda (ISO 639-1 code)
 LG – (s) Latvia (FIPS 10-4 country code)
 LGB
 (i) Lesbian, Gay, Bisexual
 Laser-guided bomb, self-explanatory
 LGBT – (i) Lesbian, Gay, Bisexual, Transgender
 LGBTI - Lesbian, Gay, Bi, Transgender, Intersex
 LGBTQ - Lesbian, Gay, Bi, Transgender, Queer
 LGBTQIA - the A standing for "asexual", "aromantic", or "agender"
 LGLO – (i) Love God, Love Others
 LGLO's – (i) Latino Greek Lettered Organizations
 LGM – (i) Little Green Men
 LGS – (i) Landsat Ground Station

LH
 LH – (s) Lithuania (FIPS 10-4 country code) – (i) Luteinising Hormone
 LHC – (i) Large Hadron Collider
 LHD
 (i) litterarum humaniorum doctor (Latin, "doctor of humane letters (humanities)")
 Left-Hand Drive (automobile)
 LHS – (i) Left Hand Side

LI
 li – (s) Limburgish language (ISO 639-1 code)
 Li – (s) Lithium
 LI – (s) Fifty-one (in Roman numerals) – (s) Liberia (FIPS 10-4 country code) – Liechtenstein (ISO 3166 digram)
 Libor – (p) London Interbank Offered Rate
 LIBS – (a) Laser Induced Breakdown Spectroscopy
 LIE – (s) Liechtenstein (ISO 3166 trigram)
 LIFO – (a) Last In, First Out
 LIGO – (a) Laser Interferometer Gravitational-Wave Observatory
 LIJ – (i) Los Ingobernables de Japón (Spanish, "The Ungovernables of Japan"), Japanese professional wrestling stable
 lim – (s) Limburgish language (ISO 639-2 code)
 lin – (s) Lingala language (ISO 639-2 code)
 LINEAR – (a) Lincoln Near-Earth Asteroid Research
 LiP, LIP – (s) Lithium ion polymer battery
 LISA – (a) Laser Interferometer Space Antenna
 lit – (s) Lithuanian language (ISO 639-2 code)
 LITAS – (a) Low Intensity Two Colour Approach System (aviation)
 LIVE – (a) Liquid Inertial Vibration Eliminator

LJ
 LJ
 (i) La Jolla
 Larry Johnson (both the American football and basketball players of that name)
 LaserJet (HP printer brand)
 Library Journal
 Linux Journal
 LiveJournal
 Ljubljana
 Lord Justice of Appeal
 (s) Sierra National Airlines (IATA code)
 LJJ – (i) Lord Justices of Appeal

LK
 LK – (s) Sri Lanka (ISO 3166 digram)
 LKA – (s) Sri Lanka (ISO 3166 trigram)
 LKL – (i) Lietuvos krepšinio lyga (Lithuanian, "Lithuanian Basketball League")
 LKR – (s) Sri Lanka rupee (ISO 4217 currency code)
 LKR4 – (s) Linkwitz-Riley 4th order (audio crossover type)

LL
 l. l. – loco laudato (Latin: "in the place quoted")
 LL – (i) Land Line (telephone) – Last Log – Late Latin – Left Limit – Lex Luthor (Superman character) – Light Line – Limited Liability – Linked List – Little League
 LLAD – (i) Low Level Air Defence
 LLB – (i) Legum Baccalaureus (Latin: Bachelor of Laws)
 LLC – (i) Limited Liability Company
 LLGC – (i) Llyfrgell Genedlaethol Cymru (National Library of Wales) – London Lesbian and Gay Centre
 LLLTV – (i) Low-Light Level Television
 LLNL – (i) Lawrence Livermore National Laboratory
 LLP – (i) Limited Liability Partnership
 LLTI – (i) Limiting Long-Term Illness – Long Lead Time Item
 LLTR – (i) Low-Level Transit Route

LM
 LMAO – (i) Laughing My Ass Off (Internet shorthand)
 LMFAO – (i) Laughing My F**king Ass Off (Internet shorthand, electro-hop duo)
 LMB – (i) Lick My Balls
 LMN – (a/i) Lifetime Movie Network
 LMS – (i) London Mathematical Society – London, Midland and Scottish (Railway)
 LMS – (i) Like My Status (Internet shorthand)
 LMV - Light Motor Vehicle

LN
 ln
 (s) Lingala language (ISO 639-1 code)
 Natural logarithm
 LNB
 (i) Liga Nacional de Básquet (Rioplatense Spanish, "National Basketball League"; top Argentine league)
 Ligue Nationale de Basketball (French, "National Basketball League"; the organization that operates France's top two leagues, and the unrelated top league of Switzerland)
 Low-Noise Block (Satellite dish)
 LNER – (i) London and North Eastern Railway railway operator from 1923 until 1947 in the United Kingdom
(i) London North Eastern Railway railway operator established in 2018 in the United Kingdom
 LNG – (i) Liquefied Natural Gas
 LNO – (p) Liaison Officer
 LNR – (i) Ligue Nationale de Rugby (French, "National Rugby League")

LO
 lo – (s) Lao language (ISO 639-1 code)
 LO – (s) Slovakia (FIPS 10-4 country code)
 LOA – (i) Limit Of Advance
 LOC
 (a/i) Level of Operational Capability
 Limited Operational Capability
 Lines Of Code
 Lines Of Communication
 see entry
 LOD
 (i) Legion of Doom, referring to any of the following:
 A group of DC Comics supervillains
 A hacker group
 A group of Philadelphia Flyers ice hockey players in the 1990s
 The Road Warriors, a professional wrestling tag team that used the name "Legion of Doom" when performing in the WWF/WWE
 Limit of Detection – see Detection limit
 LoD – (i) Lines of Development (UK)
 LOFAR – (p) Low Frequency Analyzer and Recorder / Low Frequency Analysis and Recording in sonar systems
 LOGPAC – (p) Logistics Package
 LOL – (i) Laughing Out Loud (Internet shorthand)
 LOMEZ – (p) Low Altitude Missile Engagement Zone
 LONEOS – (a) Lowell Observatory Near-Earth-Object Search
 LOOGY – (p/a) Lefty One-Out GuY, a sometimes pejorative nickname for the left-handed specialist in baseball
 loq – (p) loquitur (Latin, "(s) he speaks")
 LORTID – (p) LOng Range Target IDentification
 LOS – (i) Line Of Sight
 LOSAT – (i) Line-Of-Sight Anti-Tank (missile)
 LOTA – (i) Licentiate of the Orthodontic Technicians Association
 LOTIS – (a) Livermore Optical Transient Imaging System
 LOTR or LotR – (a) Lord of the Rings
 LOTS – (a) Logistics Over-The-Shore

LP
 LP
 (i) Linkin Park
 Linkup Point
 Listening Post
 Long Playing (record)
 Louisiana Pacific (cf. LP Field, a former name of the sports venue now known as Nissan Stadium)
 LPC – (i) Linear Predictive Coding
 LPD
 (i) Landing Platform Dock (Navy hull classification)
 Low Probability of Detection
 LPG – (i) Liquefied Petroleum Gas (cf. LNG)
 LPI – (i) Low Probability of Intercept
 LPS
 (i) Landsat Processing System
 (p) LipoPolySaccharide

LQ
 LQ – (s) Palmyra Atoll (FIPS 10-4 territory code)

LR
 Lr – (s) Lawrencium
 LR – (s) Liberia (ISO 3166 digram)
 LRAD – (i) Long Range Acoustic Device ("ell-rad")
 LRAS3 or LRAS3 – (i) Long Range Advanced Scout Surveillance System
 LR-ATGW – (i) Long-Range Anti-Tank Guided Weapon
 LRC – (i) Logistics Readiness Center
 LRD – (s) Liberian dollar (ISO 4217 currency code)
 LRF – (p) Laser rangefinder – (i) Low Readiness Forces
 LRGW – (i) Long-Range Guided Weapon
 LRICBM – (i) Limited Range ICBM
 LRIP – (i) Low Rate Initial Production
 LRP – (i) Logistics Release Point
 LRPE – (i) Long-Range Planning Element
 LRS – (i) Long Range Surveillance
 LRU – (i) Line-Replaceable Unit

LS
 L.S. – (i) Lectori Salutem (Latin, "greetings to the reader"; when the name of the reader is not known in advance)
 LS
 (i) Landing Support
 (s) Lesotho (ISO 3166 digram)
 Liechtenstein (FIPS 10-4 country code)
 (i) locus sigilli (Latin, "place of the seal")
 LSAT – (i) Law School Admission Test (often pronounced as "el-SAT")
 LSD
 (i) Landing Ship, Dock (Navy hull classification)
 librae, solidii, denarii (Latin: Pounds, shillings and pence)
 lyserg-saüre-dietylamid (German "lysergic acid diethylamide")
 LSE
 (i) Least Squares Estimate/Error
 London School of Economics
 London Stock Exchange
 LSI – (i) Large-Scale Integration
 LSIF – (i) Labour Sponsored Investment Fund
 LSL – (s) Lesotho loti (ISO 4217 currency code)
 LSND – (i) Liquid Scintillator Neutrino Detector
 LSO – (s) Lesotho (ISO 3166 trigram)
 LSST – (i) Large Synoptic Survey Telescope
 LST – (i) Landing Ship, Tank (World War II; also known, not entirely affectionately, as "Large Slow Target")
 LSVW – (i) Light Support Vehicle, Wheeled

LT
 lt – (s) Lithuanian language (ISO 639-1 code)
 Lt – (s) Lieutenant
 LtC – (s) Lieutenant-Colonel (U.S.)
 LT – (s) Lesotho (FIPS 10-4 country code) – Lithuania (ISO 3166 digram)
 LTC – (i) Long-Term Costing
 Ltd – (s) Limited
 LTDP – (i) Long-Term Defence Plan
 LTG – (s) Lieutenant General – (i) Lightning (METAR Code)
 LTI – (i) Linear Time-Invariant
 LTL – (s) Lithuanian litas (ISO 4217 currency code)
 LTM – (i) Acronym for Laughing To Myself
 LTO - (i) Long Term Occasional (substitute teachers)
 LTP – (i) Long-Term Potentiation
 LTU – (s) Lithuania (ISO 3166 trigram)
 ltz – (s) Luxembourgish language (ISO 639-2 code)

LU
 lu – (s) Tshiluba language (ISO 639-1 code)
 Lu – (s) Lutetium
 LU – (s) Acronym Love You 	
 LU – Loonatics Unleashed
 lub – (s) Tshiluba language (ISO 639-2 code)
 LUCA – (a) Last Universal Common Ancestor
 lug – (s) Luganda (ISO 639-2 code)
 LUG – (i) Linux User Group
 LULU – (a) Locally Unwanted Land Use (urbanism)
 LUT – (i) Limited User Test (ing) – Local User Terminal
 LUVW – (i) Light Utility Vehicle, Wheeled
 LUX – (s) Luxembourg (ISO 3166 trigram)

LV
 lv – (s) Latvian language (ISO 639-1 code)
 LV
 (i) Las Vegas
 (s) Latvia (ISO 3166 digram)
 (i) Launch Vehicle
 Leading Vehicle
 (s) Leave
 (i) Left Ventricle
 Level Valve
 Linking Verb
 Liverpool Victoria
 LVA – (s) Latvia (ISO 3166 trigram)
 LVAD
 (i) Left Ventricular Assist Device
 (p) Low-Velocity Airdrop
 LVEF – (i) Left Ventricular Ejection Fraction
 LVL – (s) Latvian lats (ISO 4217 currency code)

LW
 Lw – (s) Lawrencium (obsolete 1963)
 LW – (i) Land Warrior – Low Water (nautical charts)
 LWR – (i) Laser warning receiver
 LWRC – (i) Land Warfare Resources Corporation
 LWS – (i) Land Warrior System

LX
 LX – (s) Luxembourg (amateur radio ITU prefix) – Swiss International Air Lines (IATA code)
 LX – (p) Electrics (theatrical term)

LY
 LY – (s) Libya (FIPS 10-4 country code; ISO 3166 digram) – Lithuania (amateur radio ITU prefix)
 LYAO – Laugh Your Ass Off
 LYD – (s) Libyan dinar (ISO 4217 currency code)
 LYLAS – (a) Love You Like A Sister

LZ
 LZ – (s) Bulgaria (amateur radio ITU prefix) – (i) Landing Zone

References

Acronyms L